NHL FaceOff 2003 is an ice hockey video game made by SolWorks and published by Sony Computer Entertainment America, released on the PlayStation 2. It features then-Colorado Avalanche defenceman Rob Blake on its cover. Mike Emrick and Darren Pang return from the game's predecessor, NHL FaceOff 2001, to provide commentary.

Features
New features in this installment of the NHL FaceOff series include a Career Mode, in which you control the General Manager of your favourite hockey team, doing managerial duties such as signing players, making trades and drafting. It also introduces a fully revamped game engine with over 700 new animations, as well as redesigned player and arena models.

The game was also the first “FaceOff” to be made exclusively for the PlayStation 2, as well as the first one without a version for the original PlayStation.

Reception

NHL FaceOff 2003 received "mixed" reviews according to the review aggregation website Metacritic.

IGN' Chris Roper said, "The career mode is there, but you have to actually play the game to use it. The game also supports eight players, but you'll have to find others who want to play it first." GameSpot's Craig Beers said, "NHL FaceOff 2003 is a substandard hockey game [...] Everything this game tries to do is done better in other hockey games like EA's NHL series."

See also
NHL FaceOff

References

External links

2002 video games
NHL FaceOff
North America-exclusive video games
PlayStation 2 games
PlayStation 2-only games
Sony Interactive Entertainment games
Video games developed in the United States